Cameron John Salkeld (born 6 December 1998) is an English professional footballer who plays as a midfielder for Scottish League One club Clyde.

Playing career

Carlisle United
Salkeld came through the youth team at Carlisle United to make his first-team debut under Keith Curle on 4 October 2016, coming on as a 78th-minute substitute for Charlie Wyke in a 2–0 victory over Blackburn Rovers U23 in an EFL Trophy match at Brunton Park, and won a penalty after being fouled by Wes Brown. On 9 November, he went on to score in a 4–2 win over Fleetwood Town. He signed a developmental contract in May 2017, having completed his scholarship.

On 23 November 2017, he joined Northern Premier League Premier Division side Whitby Town on a one-month loan, who needed a replacement for the injured John Campbell. Then on 31 January 2018, he went on loan to Scottish League Two club Annan Athletic until the end of the 2017–18 season.

Salkeld was released by Carlisle at the end of the 2017–18 season.

Salkeld joined Gateshead permanently in the summer of 2018. Salkeld, like the majority of Gateshead's players and staff, did not have his contract renewed at the end of the season due to financial issues.

On 6 June 2019, Salkeld signed for Scottish Championship club Greenock Morton on a one-year contract.

After leaving Ayr United in January 2022, Salkeld would spend a year out with an ACL injury before signing with Scottish League One club Clyde on 21 January 2023 until the end of the season.

Style of play
Salkeld is a "powerful, forward thinking" midfielder.

Career statistics

References

1998 births
Living people
English footballers
Association football midfielders
Carlisle United F.C. players
Whitby Town F.C. players
Annan Athletic F.C. players
Gateshead F.C. players
Greenock Morton F.C. players
English Football League players
National League (English football) players
Northern Premier League players
Scottish Professional Football League players
Ayr United F.C. players